Fight Club DC was a private recreational and creative space for skateboarding, arts, music, documentation and construction, in Washington, D.C.  It was located on Blagden Alley in D.C.'s Shaw neighborhood, near the Walter E. Washington Convention Center, from 2004 to 2010. Fight Club DC was managed by Jen & Dan Zeman, Stephanie Murdock, and Ben Ashworth. It has been reported that Fight Club DC shut down due to "political differences" among the partners.

After fight club shut down, the warehouse became a pop-up art gallery "Contemporary Wing" but it was soon redeveloped and is now a five-story, 70-unit apartment called The Colonel.

Skating 
Primary skating features included:
 an indoor bowl, comprising wooden ramps, metal joiners, spines, walls (evolving features)
 two outdoor halfpipe ramps about 4–5 ft.
 music (iPod DJ or live bands during events)

A donation was requested for all skaters.  Under 18 were allowed to skate with prior permission from a manager.  Weekly skating sessions were usually BYOB. Participants included people on BMX, power stilts, and inline skates.

Art and history 
Fight Club DC was established due to the 2004 demise of Vans Skate Park.  Anthony Smallwood and Ben Ashworth acquired the ramps (and the Vans column padding) and decided to set up an "underground" indoor space for skateboarding, music, art, and of course, parties.  After two years of increasing popularity and a wildly destructive party, a media campaign was organized to proclaim the "death" of fight club.  Meanwhile operations continued, with emphasis on more low-key celebrations.

Fight Club hosted many bands paired with art exhibitions, with its largest recent events as a part of DC Photo Week's Fixation curated by Anthony Smallwood.
  Fight Club  hosted the 2008 Skaters for Public Parks Summit

References

External links 
Primary Flickr Fight Club Photo Set
Flickr Fight Club Photo Set
Flickr Fight Club Photo Set
NPR Photo Essay
Skating Video Video Shredordie

Skateparks in the United States